Cryptocarya floydii  is an Australian rainforest tree. It occurs in steep dry rocky gullies in northern New South Wales and adjacent areas in Queensland as far north as Bunya Mountains National Park. It grows as far south as the upper gullies of the Guy Fawkes River and the Macleay River. The common name is gorge laurel or Glenugie laurel, after the type locality of Glenugie Peak, near Grafton, New South Wales.

This laurel is considered rare, with a ROTAP rating of 3RCi. It is named after the eminent rainforest botanist Alexander Floyd.

Description 
A small tree with a dark dense crown of leaves, up to 15 metres tall and with a trunk diameter of 25 cm. The trunk is irregular, sometimes fluted and buttressed and multi stemmed. Dark coloured bark, tough to touch with wrinkles, bumps and vertical lines. Small branches dark green to black, leaf buds with soft hairs.

Leaves 30 to 110 mm long, 10 to 35 mm wide Leaves broad lanceolate in shape with a long tip and a yellow midrib.

Flowers & fruit 
Fragrant pale green flowers form from October to November. Petals 1 mm long. The fruit is a black shiny drupe, globular around 12 mm long. A thin layer of flesh over the relatively large seed would offer little nourishment for feeding birds. Alexander Floyd considers this fruit to be mimetic. As the fruit resembles more fleshy fruits such as the vine Tetrastigma nitens. The seed is ribbed and pointed as is the case with many Cryptocarya seeds. Fruit matures from February to April.

References

External links

Flora of New South Wales
Flora of Queensland
Trees of Australia
floydii
Laurales of Australia
Vulnerable biota of Queensland
Vulnerable flora of Australia